José Posada Herrera (Llanes, Asturias, 31 March 1814 – 7 September 1885) was a Spanish jurist and politician, President of the Council of Ministers 1883–1884. He was a member of the Dynastic Left party.

1814 births
1885 deaths
Prime Ministers of Spain
Knights of the Golden Fleece of Spain
Presidents of the Congress of Deputies (Spain)